In enzymology, a dCTP deaminase is an enzyme that catalyzes the chemical reaction

dCTP + H2O  dUTP + NH3

Thus, the two substrates of this enzyme are dCTP and H2O, whereas its two products are dUTP and NH3.

This enzyme belongs to the family of hydrolases, those acting on carbon-nitrogen bonds other than peptide bonds, specifically in cyclic amidines.  The systematic name of this enzyme class is dCTP aminohydrolase. Other names in common use include deoxycytidine triphosphate deaminase, and 5-methyl-dCTP deaminase.  This enzyme participates in pyrimidine metabolism.

Structural studies

References

 

EC 3.5.4
Enzymes of known structure